Magothy may refer to:

Places
Magothy Bay Natural Area Preserve in Virginia
The Magothy Quartzite Quarry Archeological Site in Maryland

Rivers
The Magothy River in Maryland
The Little Magothy River in Maryland

Ships
USS Magothy (AVP-45), a proposed United States Navy seaplane tender that was cancelled in 1943 prior to construction.